Heinz Kohnen (5 February 1938 – 25 July 1997) was a German scientist and geophysicist known for his work in polar research.  Kohnen helped determine the site of the first German Antarctic station during an expedition from 1979-1980. Kohnen-Station, a field station on Dronning Maud Land, Antarctica, is named after him.

References 

German geophysicists
1938 births
1997 deaths